The GMC Athletic Stadium in Bambolim is the first integrated athletic complex in Goa. It has been constructed according to IAAF specifications and norms and has hosted the athletic events of 2014 Lusofonia Games. The field is covered with natural turf and has been used as the training ground for the FC Goa developmental squad. In 2020, it was chosen as one of the three venues to host for 2020-21 season of Indian Super League.

History

GMC Stadium was opened in 2014 on the occasion of the 2014 Lusofonia Games, a multi-sport event that represent athletes from Portuguese-speaking countries and territories. The stadium has been using as an athletic complex by the Sports Authority of Goa as well as an association football venue for the Goa Professional League matches.

The stadium has also hosted the U-18 Y-League, U-15 Y-League, U-13 Y-League, Santosh Trophy and I-League games previously.

Indian Super League
The stadium was the official home ground of Kerala Blasters FC, Mumbai City FC, Chennaiyin FC and Odisha FC for the 2020–21 Indian Super League season due to the COVID-19 outbreak in the country . The entire season was played in selected venues in close proximity in Goa to minimise any chance of outbreak in the bio-bubble.

See also
 Fatorda Stadium
 Tilak Maidan Stadium
 Duler Stadium

References

Football venues in Goa
Sports venues in Goa
Multi-purpose stadiums in India
Indian Super League stadiums
Sports venues completed in 2014
2014 establishments in Goa